Albert Henry "Digger" Kettle (3 June 1922 – 1 March 1999) was an English footballer who played for Colchester United.

Career
Born in Colchester, Kettle served in the Royal Air Force in Rhodesia and Italy during World War II. After playing for Stanway Rovers, Chapel and Wakes Colne and Arclight Sports as a teenager, he signed for Colchester United in 1946. Remaining part-time, he played as a full-back for Colchester in the Southern League and Football League whilst continuing to work for Woods, a fan manufacturer in Colchester.

After 23 appearances in the Football League, Kettle signed for Sudbury Town in 1955. After two seasons with Sudbury he signed for Woods Athletic, where he ended his playing career.

He died in 1999.

Honours

Club
Colchester United
Southern Football League runner-up: 1949–50
Southern Football League Cup winner: 1949–50
Southern Football League Cup runner-up: 1947–48, 1948–49

References

External links
 Digger Kettle at Colchester United Archive Database

1922 births
Sportspeople from Colchester
Royal Air Force personnel of World War II
English footballers
Stanway Rovers F.C. players
Colchester United F.C. players
Sudbury Town F.C. players
1999 deaths
Association football defenders
British expatriates in Southern Rhodesia
British expatriates in Italy
Royal Air Force airmen
Military personnel from Colchester